Needle flower or Needle-flower may refer to various plants, including:

Posoqueria latifolia, needle flower tree
Posoqueria longiflora, needle flower tree
Daylily and Hemerocallis fulva, known as Golden Needle Flowers in Asian cuisine
Jasminum auriculatum, needle-flower jasmine
Psydrax subcordata, needle flower tree
Justicia longii, white needle-flower